This is a list of secondary highways in Rainy River District, most of which serve isolated and sparsely populated areas in the Rainy River District of northwestern Ontario.

Highway 502

Highway 600 

Provincial Highway 600 is a secondary highway in the Canadian province of Ontario. Its western terminus is Highway 11 in Rainy River, and its eastern terminus is at Highway 71. It is also one of only a few Ontario highways that are still gravel.

Highway 602 

Highway 602 is a secondary highway in the Canadian province of Ontario. Its western terminus is Highway 11 in Emo, and its eastern terminus is at Highway 71 in Fort Frances.

Highway 611

Highway 613 

Secondary Highway 613 is a secondary highway in the Canadian province of Ontario. Its northern terminus is near Hope Lake and the Northwest Bay First Nation Reserve, and its southern terminus is at Highway 602.

Highway 615 

Secondary Highway615, commonly referred to as Highway615, is a secondary highway in the Canadian province of Ontario, located in Rainy River District. The route connects Highway 71 (the Trans-Canada Highway) with Burditt Lake and Clearwater Lake. Highway615 was assumed in early 1956.

Highway 617

Highway 619

Highway 621

Highway 622

Highway 623

Highway 633 

Secondary Highway633, commonly referred to as Highway633, is a secondary highway in the Canadian province of Ontario, located in Rainy River District.

Highway633 was assumed by the Department of Highways, predecessor to the modern Ministry of Transportation, on October29, 1959. It has remained unchanged since then.

References 

 
Roads in Rainy River District